Simiri is a village in the Ouallam Department of the Tillabéri Region in southwestern Niger.

References

Communes of Tillabéri Region